António Poppe Lopes Cardoso (27 March 1933 – 8 June 2000) was a Portuguese politician.

Biography
He was born in Praia in the island of Santiago, Cape Verde in what was used to be a Portuguese colony.

He studied at the High Institute of Agronomy (Instituto Superior de Agronomia), he is an opponent of Salazarism and was stripped from associative functions.

In 1962, he was captured by PIDE, following his participation in the Beja coupe.  Not long after, he went to exile first to Paris then to Brazil where he remained until 1971.  Afterwards, he returned to Portugal and returned to the same institute where he went earlier.  IN 1973, not long after the congress was founded became part of the Socialist Party in which he went to.

During the Constitutional Assembly from 1975 to 1976, he was a leader of the parliamentary group of the Socialist Party (PS).  He took part in ministries including the Ministry of Agriculture in the Sixth Provisional Government, led by Pinheiro de Azevedo and in the First Constitutional Government headed by Mário Soares.

He disliked the new agrarian rules of the Socialist Party, he was demoted, he became an independent deputy.  He founded the Worker's Brotherhood, a movement that would lead to a new party, the UEDS (Left Union of Socialist Democracy).  In representation since the tiny party, he was elected deputy of the Republican Assembly in the Second Legislature, he was later re-elected, with an independent deputy, newly to the Socialist Party's list.

He was an author of different books and articles on the reality of Portuguese agriculture and its political party system.

Publications
 Um ensaio de análise gráfica da influência do meio físico nos resultados económicos da empresa agrícola (Lisbon, 1960).
 A estabilização dos mercados agrícolas e a organização da produção ["The Establishemtn of Agricultural Markets and Production Organization"] (Lisbon, 1961).
 A região a oeste da Serra dos Candeeiros [A Region West of Serra dos Candeeiros] (Lisbon, Calouste Gulbenkian Foundation, 1961).
 A concentração da actividade agrícola e a integração empresarial ["Concentration on Agricultural Activity and Company Integration"] (Lisbon, Centro de Estudos de Economia Agrária (Agrarian Economic Studies Centre), 1962).
 Luta pela reforma agrária ["Fight for Agrarian Reforms"] (Lisbon, Diabril, 1976).
 A liberdade defende-se construindo o socialismo, o socialismo constrói-se defendendo a liberdade (Beja, Fed. de Beja do Partido Socialista, 1976).
 A nova lei da reforma agrária ["A New Law on Agrarian Reforms"] (Lisbon, Livros Horizonte, 1977).
 Os sistemas eleitorais ["Electoral Systems"] (Lisbon, Salamandra, 1993).
  ["Parliamentary Interventions by Lopes Cardoso"] (Lisbon, A.R., 2003).

References

1933 births
2000 deaths
People from Praia
Socialist Party (Portugal) politicians